The Motorola Timeport is a series of candybar and flip mobile phones manufactured by Motorola. They were first released in 1999.

The models are:
L7089 (1999)
P7389 (2000)
P8767 (2000)
250 (2001)
270c (2001)
280 (2001)
260 (2002)

The flip phone version of the Timeport was included with select late 1990s and early 2000s Mercedes-Benz vehicles. The phone integrated with the vehicle's COMAND infotainment system, as well as its telematics system. In these vehicles, the phone's Motorola logo was replaced with the Mercedes-Benz "Star" logo on the outside of the flip, but retained the Motorola and "Timeport" branding on the inside of the flip, as well as the Motorola logo appearing on the phone's monochrome display screen when it was first powered on.

Motorola Timeport P8767 – The first mobile phone with OLED display.
Motorola Timeport P8767, introduced in September 2000 and released in December 2000, includes the Organic Electroluminescent phone display, developed by Tohoku Pioneer Corporation, using Pioneer OEL technology (PM-OLED display in today's terminology).
The display is not full color, but area color (green, blue and red in own areas).

References

Timeport
Mobile phones introduced in 1999
Mobile phones with infrared transmitter